Helianthemum marifolium (syn. Helianthemum alpinum Delarbre) is an endangered ornamental plant in the family Cistaceae.

References
 
 Breeding System, Flower Visitors and Seedling Survival of Two Endangered Species of Helianthemum (Cistaceae) - Javier Rodríguez-Pérez

External links
 Helianthemum marifolium in the wild

marifolium